Events in the year 1873 in Japan.

Incumbents
Monarch: Emperor Meiji

Governors
Aichi Prefecture: Iseki Ushitora
Akita Prefecture: Sugio Magoshichiro (until May 5), Senkichi Kokushi (starting May 5)
Aomori Prefecture: J. Hishida
Ehime Prefecture: Egi Yasunao
Fukui Prefecture: Kotobuki Murata
Fukushima Prefecture: Taihe Yasujo
Gifu Prefecture: Joren Hasegawa
Gunma Prefecture: Sada Aoyama (until November 2), vacant (starting November 2)
Hiroshima Prefecture: Date Muneoki
Ibaraki Prefecture: Toru Watanabe (starting September 9)
Iwate Prefecture: Korekiyo Shima
Kagawa Prefecture: Mohei Hayashi (until February 20)
Kochi Prefecture: Iwasaki Nagatake
Kyoto Prefecture: Hase Nobuatsu
Mie Prefecture: Ryo Shioya
Miyagi Prefecture: Tokisuke Miyagi
Miyazaki Prefecture: Weiken Fukuyama
Nagano Prefecture: Tachiki Kenzen then Narasaki Hiroshi
Niigata Prefecture: Kusumoto Masataka
Oita Prefecture: Kei Morishita
Osaka Prefecture: Norobu Watanabe
Saga Prefecture: Taku Shigeru then Ishii Kuni then Michitoshi Iwamura
Saitama Prefecture: Morihide Nomura then Tasuke Shirane
Shiname Prefecture: Kamiyama Ren
Tochigi Prefecture: Iseki Ushitora
Tokushima Prefecture: Nobuhiro Sato
Tokyo: Miki Nabeshima
Toyama Prefecture: Tadahiro Okubo
Yamagata Prefecture: ......
Yamaguchi Prefecture: Mishima Michitsune

Events
January 1 - Japan begins using the Gregorian calendar.
January 4 - With the adoption of the Western calendar, the  — Jinjitsu on January 7, Jōshi on March 3, Tango on May 5, Tanabata on July 7 and Chōyō on September 9) — are abolished.

References

 
1870s in Japan
Japan
Years of the 19th century in Japan